The Pistol River is a coastal stream that meanders for  through the Southern Oregon Coast Range to the Pacific Ocean near the unincorporated community of Pistol River in the U.S. state of Oregon. The river received its name after pioneer James Mace lost his pistol in it in 1853.

The Pistol River supports populations of chinook salmon, threatened coho salmon, steelhead, and coastal cutthroat trout. The river flows generally through forests where logging has damaged the fish habitat. Work to restore the habitat is ongoing.

Course
From its headwaters in the forest, the river flows south at first, receiving Meadow Creek from the left and then the East Fork Pistol River, also from the left. Crook Creek enters from the right at the community of Pistol River, where the river passes under Pistol River Loop Highway and then U.S. Route 101 before entering the Pacific Ocean at Pistol River State Scenic Viewpoint.

Watershed
As of 2001, about 57 percent of the basin was public land managed by the United States Forest Service (52 percent) and the Bureau of Land Management (5 percent). About 43 percent of the basin was privately owned. Forestry, whether public or private, was the dominant land use, involving 97 percent of the watershed. The remaining 3 percent was used for farming, livestock grazing, and rural homes.

See also
List of rivers of Oregon

References

Works cited

External links
Pistol River Watershed

Rivers of Curry County, Oregon
Rivers of Oregon